Frank Childs (born July 17, 1867, Texas; died June 20, 1936, Waukegan, Illinois), "The Crafty Texan", was an African American boxer who fought professionally  out of Chicago from 1892 to 1911 and twice held the World Colored Heavyweight Championship. Fighting at a weight of between 160 and 185 lbs., the short, stocky Childs fought middleweights, light-heavyweights and heavyweights. He had a powerful punch.

Journeyman
He made his pro boxing debut on February 18, 1892 in Los Angeles against French Canadian George LaBlanche from Quebec, knocking him out in the third round. They fought again on  March 24, with four-ounce gloves. In the eighth round, LaBlanche grabbed Childs by the waist, threw him to the canvas, and then kicked him. The badly hurt Childs got up and wrestled LaBlanche, putting him in a half-nelson before elevating LaBlanche and throwing him. The police stopped the fight and the referee awarded Childs the decision after disqualifying LaBlanche.

Childs fought 15 more bouts before getting a shot at the colored heavyweight title. Along the way, he fought Bob Armstrong, the colored heavyweight champ, in a six-round non-title contest held on March 7, 1897 in Philadelphia. Childs won on points. His fight before that had been with white heavyweight contender Joe Choynski (the mentor of future colored heavyweight and world heavyweight title-holder Jack Johnson), who won by knockout (K.O.) in the third of a three-round fight.

In the intervening thirteen months before Armstrong gave him a shot for the title, Childs squared off on January 8, 1898 at Chicago's 2nd Regiment Armory against a boxer named Klondike (real name John Haines or John W. Haynes), so called because he was supposed to be a great find (evoking the Klondike Gold Rush). It was Klondike's first fight, and he was K.O.-ed by Childs. Klondike would go on to beat future world heavyweight champ Jack Johnson in Johnson's third pro fight and claim what he called the "Black Heavyweight Championship".

Childs and Klondike would meet again, frequently, as African American boxers were forced to fight one another often due to the color bar.

World Colored Heavyweight Champ
Childs first fought for the World Colored Heavyweight crown  on  January 29, 1898, knocking out colored champion Bob Armstrong in the second round. On February 26, he defended the title against Klondike on a technical knock-out in the fourth round of a scheduled six-round bout. In another six-round defense held in Chicago on June 3, he retained the title by drawing with Charley Strong, who had fought Armstrong for the title vacated by Peter Jackson.

In his next fight on September 4 of that year, he lost the title to George Byers on points in a 20-rounder. Regardless of losing the title, Childs fought Armstrong again on March 4, 1899 in Cincinnati, Ohio in a fight announced as a title bout, despite Byers being the legitimate champion. Childs defeated Armstrong via a TKO in the sixth round of a 10-round bout.

On August 11, 1899, he won the "Black Heavyweight Championship" claimed by Klondike Haynes in a six-round contest in Chicago by outpointing the so-called "Black Hercules". On October 28 of that year, they met in a rematch in Chicago in which Childs retained the black heavyweight title by kayoing Haynes in the third round of a six-round contest.

On March 16, 1900, Childs put his black heavyweight title on the line and Byers put up his coloured heavyweight crown in a six-round bout that ended in a draw. He next fought Joe Butler on December 15, 1900 for the black heavyweight title, dispatching Butler via KO in the sixth. Finally, he took back the Coloured World Heavyweight Championship legitimately from Byers on  March 16, 1901 in Hot Springs, Arkansas, kayoing him in the 17th round of a 20-round fight. (He did not put up his black heavyweight title, which he never claimed again.)

He lost the coloured heavyweight title to Denver Ed Martin in a bout in Chicago on February 25, 1902, being out-pointed in a six-round contest. Not one to surrender a title easily, he billed his October 9, 1902 fight with Joe Walcott as a defence of his coloured heavyweight title. He beat Walcott via a TKO in the 3rd round when Walcott quit, claiming that he was injured. Childs was winning the fight at the time.

Requiem for a Heavyweight
Jack Johnson eliminated any pretensions Childs had to the colored crown when he beat him via TKO in the 12th round of a fight on October 21, 1902 in Los Angeles. Childs's corner claimed he dislocated his elbow. He lost to Joe Choynski on December 1, 1902, being outpointed in a six-rounder. After a 16-month lay-off, he beat Chicago Jack Johnson (not the future champion) on successive days in March 1904, knocking him out in the 2nd both times.

The real Jack Johnson had won the colored heavyweight title from Denver Ed Martin on February 5, 1903, and June 2, 1904 in Chicago, the two champs, the reigning champion and the two-time former champion, met in a six-round bout. Johnson won on points.

He met up with old adversary Klondike Haynes on July 7 of that year and KO'd him in the 8th. There was no talk of championships, colored or black. Jack Johnson was the champ. After losing on points to Denver Ed Martin in a six-rounder on November 1, he retired.  He came back six years later and fought tyro light-heavyweight Horace "Jack" Taylor on  February 2, 1911. The six-round bout, Taylor's second pro fight, resulted in a draw.

Record
In a career that stretched from 1892 to 1911, he racked up a career record of  41 wins (25 by knockout) against nine losses (being KO-ed three times) and eight draws.

Legacy and honors

In 2020 award-winning author Mark Allen Baker published the first comprehensive account of The World Colored Heavyweight Championship, 1876-1937, with McFarland & Company, a leading independent publisher of academic & nonfiction books. This history traces the advent and demise of the Championship, the stories of the talented professional athletes who won it, and the demarcation of the color line both in and out of the ring.

For decades the World Colored Heavyweight Championship was a useful tool to combat racial oppression-the existence of the title a leverage mechanism, or tool, used as a technique to counter a social element, “drawing the color line.”

Professional boxing record

References
 

1867 births
1936 deaths
Boxers from Alabama
Boxers from Texas
Boxers from Illinois
Heavyweight boxers
African-American boxers
World colored heavyweight boxing champions
American male boxers
20th-century African-American people